Godfried 'Monty' Dumond (born 20 August 1982) is a South African rugby union player for the  in the Currie Cup and the Rugby Challenge.

Career

He then moved to Europe where he played rugby for Overmach Parma in Italy in 2004-2005, then moved to France for spells at Aurillac in 2005–2006 and Racing Métro 92 in 2006–2007.

He was also included in the  Super Rugby squads in 2009 and 2010. It was later announced that he would join them on a permanent deal for 2011. Before the 2011 Currie Cup First Division season started, however, it was announced that he joined  on a loan spell.

In 2012, he joined club side Despatch, where he also became the backline coach.

After two seasons at Despatch, Dumond returned to provincial rugby when he joined Wellington-based side  for the 2014 Currie Cup qualification tournament.

References

South African rugby union players
Eastern Province Elephants players
Sharks (Currie Cup) players
Sharks (rugby union) players
Griquas (rugby union) players
Leopards (rugby union) players
Living people
1982 births
People from Klerksdorp
Racing 92 players
Rugby union fly-halves
Rugby union players from North West (South African province)